Krystal Parker (born 28 October 1990) is a football goalkeeper. She played for Blackburn Rovers Ladies and represented the senior Northern Ireland squad.

Club career
Parker began playing football at the age of six, soon joining Manchester United where she played mixed football before playing for their Under-10 girls' team. She joined the Stockport County Ladies' Centre of Excellence, progressing to their senior team, Parker joined Blackburn Rovers Ladies in the 2008 close season, as understudy to first-choice senior keeper Danielle Hill. In only the second game of the 2008–09 season, Hill suffered cruciate ligament damage against Chelsea, with Parker taking over for the remainder of the season. She also began the following season as Rovers' first choice, playing in the 1–1 draw with Doncaster Rovers Belles on the opening day of the season.

After signing for Aston Villa, Parker lost her place in the team due to an injured finger.

International career
Parker was included in England's 30-player provisional squad for the Under-20 Women's World Cup, just months after signing for Blackburn. Although later left on stand-by for the final squad, a month later she was asked to join the Under-23 squad's training camp.

She was called into the senior Northern Ireland panel in October 2011. After playing in a friendly game against Republic of Ireland, Parker said, "I'm very proud to have held recognition for both England and Ireland, but I'm very excited and look forward to helping and relishing the exciting challenges ahead with the Northern Ireland squad."

Statistics

References

English women's footballers
Blackburn Rovers L.F.C. players
1990 births
Living people
FA Women's National League players
Northern Ireland women's international footballers
Women's association footballers from Northern Ireland
Women's association football goalkeepers
Aston Villa W.F.C. players
Footballers from Oldham
Stockport County L.F.C. players